La honradez es un estorbo ("Honesty is a Hindrance") is a 1937 Mexican film. It stars Sara García.

Cast
Leopoldo 'Chato' Ortín
Gloria Morel
Luis G. Barreiro
Sara García
Adela Jaloma
Joaquín Coss
Manuel Noriega

External links
 

1937 films
1930s Spanish-language films
Mexican black-and-white films
Mexican comedy-drama films
1937 comedy-drama films
1930s Mexican films